Lehmber Singh is an Indian athlete. He won a silver medal in  4 × 100 m relay and a bronze medal in the  400 metres hurdles in the 1974 Tehran Asian Games.

References

Athletes (track and field) at the 1974 Asian Games
Asian Games silver medalists for India
Asian Games bronze medalists for India
Asian Games medalists in athletics (track and field)
Medalists at the 1974 Asian Games
Possibly living people
Year of birth missing
Indian athletes